The Borough of Tunbridge Wells is a local government district and borough in Kent, England. It takes its name from its main town, Royal Tunbridge Wells.

The district was formed on 1 April 1974, by the merger of the municipal borough of Royal Tunbridge Wells along with Southborough urban district, Cranbrook Rural District and most of Tonbridge Rural District.

Description of borough

Location
The borough of Tunbridge Wells lies along the south western border of Kent, partly on the northern edge of the Weald, the remainder on the Weald Clay plain in the upper reaches of the rivers Teise and Beult.

The North Weald area
The restricted area immediately to the north and west of Tunbridge Wells lies within the Weald. The presence of sandstone outcrops and the chalybeate springs, together with old workings, point to ancient iron manufacturing in the area.

Weald Clay plain
This plain is part of the so-called Garden of England, named for its extensive orchards and former hop farms, sheep and cattle. A string of villages lies across this plain, from Brenchley and Horsmonden to Benenden and Headcorn.

Communications
The main roads through the borough are the A21 London to Hastings road and in the east, the A229, which runs from the A21 at Hurst Green through Cranbrook to Maidstone.

There is a railway line across the clay plain in an almost unbroken straight line between Redhill, Tonbridge and Ashford, Kent. The SER line to Hastings passes through Tunbridge Wells; here there was once a further branch connection south-eastwards to Groombridge, and at Paddock Wood is the southern terminus of the Medway Valley Line to Maidstone.

Politics

The Council is composed of 48 councillors representing 20 wards across the borough. Eight wards are within Royal Tunbridge Wells itself: Broadwater, Culverden; Pantiles & St Marks; Park; Rusthall; Sherwood & St John's and St. James. The remainder are rural wards covering the other main towns and villages.

Following the 2022 election, the council remains under no overall control (NOC). The largest party, with 16 councillors, are the Liberal Democrats. The Conservatives, who were the largest party and leaders of a minority administration prior to the 2022 election, have 13 councillors. The Tunbridge Wells Alliance, a local party formed in opposition to the cancelled Calverley Square development, have 9 councillors, whilst the Labour Party hold 7 councillors. There are also 3 seats belonging to Independents.

he first Tunbridge Wells Borough Council was elected prior to the borough’s official formation, in the 1973 United Kingdom local elections. The Conservative Party won a majority. After 1976, when the council was re-elected, the Conservatives controlled ¾ of seats. The borough became one of the first to introduce a system of elections by thirds under section 7 (4) (b) of the Local Government Act 1972, as one of 44 non-metropolitan districts to have passed a resolution requesting the change. The Conservative Party maintained their control over the council.

1990s: Liberal Democrat Rule and Conservative Reclamation
In 1994, the council came under no overall control (NOC). It was the first election in which the Conservatives did not win a majority in the borough. This state lasted for two years until 1996, when the Liberal Democrats gained a majority in the borough for the first time in its history. However, the Liberal Democrats lost their majority before the next election due to defections, which emboldened the optimistic Conservatives during the local election campaign of 1998. Then-leader of the Liberal Democrats Paddy Ashdown visited the area to help campaign for his party, who were quite confident in their ability to retain the borough administration. Among the issues fought over were plans for traffic calming and widening the A21. The Liberal Democrats were also criticised by the Conservatives for their plans to use parts of the Common for cycle and bus lanes. In a major upset for the Liberal Democrats, the Conservative Party won every single seat that the Lib Dems were defending in the election, providing the party with a majority in the borough, which was seen as traditionally pro-Tory, once more.

2000s: Continued Conservative Rule and Labour Decline
In 2007, the Labour Party was completely pushed out of the council after losing its last councillor, Ronnie Ooi. Ooi, erstwhile the representative for Southborough and High Brooms ward, had distanced himself from the national Labour government during his campaign, calling on the electorate to support a continued opposition to Tory rule in the borough. The seat returned to Labour in 2014, bringing the party back to the council.

2019-2021: Conservatives Losing Ground
The 2019 election saw the Conservatives lose many seats, although they retained their majority. Labour doubled their representation on the council, and the Tunbridge Wells Alliance (TWA), contesting their first election, increased their seat count from 1 to 6. The Liberal Democrats more than doubled their presence. In a by-election in Culverden ward held later that year, the Conservative Party lost another seat to the Liberal Democrats.

There were no local elections held in 2020 due to the COVID-19 pandemic. In 2021, the Conservatives, who made significant gains across the country in that year’s local elections, continued to lose ground to the other parties in the council. After the election, they held 24 of 48 seats. In November of the same year, a by-election was held for one seat in Speldhurst and Bidborough ward, in which the Tories lost to TWA candidate and local businessman Matthew Sankey. This caused the Conservatives to lose their majority, creating a minority administration.

2022: End of Conservative Administration and Formation of Coalition
The Conservatives were displaced as the largest party by the Liberal Democrats following the 2022 election, with Mayor Chris Woodward losing his seat and Leader of the Council Tom Dawlings seeing his majority significantly reduced in his ward. Councillor Ben Chapelard, the leader of the Liberal Democrat group on the council, chalked the Tories’ huge losses up to not just dissatisfaction with the national Conservative government’s response to the cost-of-living crisis and anger over Partygate, but also frustration with the local Tory government’s pattern of spending, including £10.8 million spent on the cancelled Calverley Square development, and concern over a waste collection contract. Chapelard stated his intention to reduce the council’s budget deficit, which he claimed would cumulatively amount to £20 million by 2028. Tom Dawlings, who led the Conservative group in the council, disagreed with Chapelard’s accusations of council ‘maladministration’ and ‘complacency and arrogance’, naming as some of his administration’s successes £54 million in grants distributed to businesses during the COVID-19 pandemic and the construction of the Amelia Scott building in the town centre. Describing the poor performance of his party in the elections as ‘a real disappointment’, he announced his resignation as council leader.

On 13 May 2022, the TWA released a statement claiming that negotiations with the Liberal Democrats on forming a new administration had not begun, rejecting claims by Chapelard in the Kent and Sussex Courier that discussions were ongoing. They stated that the Alliance and the Labour Party had both contacted the Liberal Democrats to start talks, but that they had been told negotiations could only begin on 15 May 2022, which the TWA stated was only two days before ‘many decisions need[ed] to be made and submitted’.

On 16 May 2022, the Liberal Democrats, the Tunbridge Wells Alliance, the Labour Party, and one independent councillor, Rodney Atkins, agreed to form a coalition to run the council. Nick Pope, deputy group leader of the TWA, said that there were 'some minor details to hammer out', but that everything was 'pretty much in place'. The new administration was confirmed at the annual council meeting on 25 May 2022.

Politics

In the 2016 European Union referendum, Tunbridge Wells was the only district in Kent that voted to remain in the EU (54.89%).

Places of interest
Apart from Tunbridge Wells itself, places of interest in the Borough include:
 Bedgebury Pinetum
 Bewl Water reservoir near Lamberhurst for leisure water pursuits and outdoor conferences
 Sissinghurst Castle gardens: the home of Vita Sackville-West
 facilities for rock-climbing at the 'High Rocks', 2 miles west of Tunbridge Wells

See also
 List of places of worship in Tunbridge Wells (borough)

References

External links
 

 
Non-metropolitan districts of Kent
Politics of the Borough of Tunbridge Wells
Boroughs in England